Philippe Jean (born 27 May 1959) is a French former professional footballer who played as a midfielder and defender.

Club career 
Jean started off his career firstly at US Palaiseau, and then later in the academy of Paris Saint-Germain. He made his first appearance for PSG on 26 November 1977 in a 0–0 draw against Monaco. Jean made his final appearance for the club in a 1–0 loss against Nantes on 27 April 1979. After playing a total of 14 games across 2 years for PSG, he joined Paris FC.

Jean spent three seasons at Paris FC before transferring over to Viry-Châtillon for the final season of his career.

International career 
Jean was a cadet and youth international for France.

After football 
Jean retired from football in 1983, at the age of 24. Later on in his life, he became the manager of Club Sportif d'Igny before becoming the president of Les Ulis.

Career statistics

References 

Living people
1959 births
People from Antony, Hauts-de-Seine
French footballers
Association football defenders
Association football midfielders
Ligue 1 players
Ligue 2 players
Paris Saint-Germain F.C. players
Paris FC players
ES Viry-Châtillon players
French football managers

French football chairmen and investors
France youth international footballers